Live at the Whisky a Go Go may refer to:

 Live at the Whisky a Go Go from Humble Pie
 Live at the Whisky a Go Go (Herbie Mann album)
 Live at the Whiskey a Go-Go (The Stooges album)
 Live at the Whisky a Go-Go (X album)
 Live at the Whisky a Go Go: The Complete Recordings by Otis Redding
 Live at the Whisky by Kansas
 Live at the Whisky 1998 by Prototype
 Live at the Whisky by Green Day
 Live at the Whisky by Mentors (band)
 Live at the Whisky by Stryper
 Live at the Whisky: One Night Only by Vince Neil
 Germicide: Live at the Whisky, 1977
 Killers Live at the Whiskey
  Live at the Whisky A-Go-Go by Alice Cooper
 Recorded Live at Hollywood's Famous Whisky a Go-Go by Jon and the Nightriders

See also 
 :Category:Albums recorded at the Whisky a Go Go